State Road 116 (NM 116) is a  long state highway in the US state of New Mexico. NM 116's northern terminus is at I-25 Bus. south of Belen, and the southern terminus is in Bernardo at U.S. Route 60 (US 60).

Major intersections

See also

References

116
Transportation in Socorro County, New Mexico
Transportation in Valencia County, New Mexico